Great Baddow High School is a comprehensive secondary school in Chelmsford, Essex, England. It is a sports college with academy status and with science as a second specialism. It draws its students from primary schools in the Chelmsford area.

History
The school opened on 8 September 1965 as Baddow Comprehensive, with 16 staff and 227 children in First Year only. In 2002, it became one of seven Sports Colleges in Essex; in 2011 it converted to Academy status while retaining its sports specialism. In late 2014 it adopted science as a second specialism.

As commemorated in its main reception, the school has had the following headteachers since its establishment:
 1965: James Gordon B.Sc.
 1980: Roy Baldock B.A.
 1991: Roger Hunton M.Sc.
 2010: Carrie Lynch B.A. (Hons)
 2019: Paul Farmer B.A.

Notable people
Rebecca Gallantree, diver
Sam Cook, cricketer
Aaron Beard, cricketer, attended Sixth Form at the school
Graham Nelson, Mathematician, poet, game designer

References

External links
 Official website

Academies in Essex
Secondary schools in Essex
Educational institutions established in 1965
1965 establishments in England